Rajiv Gandhi Institute of Technology may refer to:
Rajiv Gandhi Institute of Technology, Kottayam
Rajiv Gandhi Institute of Technology, Mumbai